Dwight Nevil (born August 25, 1944) is an American professional golfer who played on the PGA Tour in the 1970s and later played on the Champions Tour.

Nevil was born in Altus, Oklahoma. He played on the PGA Tour full-time from 1971–1977. He never won an official PGA Tour event; however, among his dozen top-10 finishes were a pair of consecutive runner-up finishes in September 1973 at the Quad Cities Open and the B.C. Open.  He won the unofficial Magnolia State Classic in 1973 and 1974, and is the only player ever to win this event in two straight years. His best finish in a major was T-53 at the 1974 PGA Championship. Poor health (irregular heartbeat) and the failed treatments that tried to correct it ruined his putting stroke and forced him to retire from the Tour before the 1978 season.

Upon reaching the age of 50 in August 1994, Nevil began play on the Senior PGA Tour and later, the Sunbelt Senior Tour. His best finish in a Champions Tour event is a T-30 at the 2001 State Farm Senior Classic. Today, Nevil works in the golf equipment and outfitting industry and is based in Mineola, Texas.

Regular career wins (Non-PGA Tour events)
1973 Magnolia State Classic
1974 Magnolia State Classic
1984 Northern Texas PGA Championship

See also
1970 PGA Tour Qualifying School graduates

References

External links

Dwight Nevil Career Stats by Season

American male golfers
PGA Tour golfers
PGA Tour Champions golfers
Golfers from Oklahoma
Golfers from Texas
People from Altus, Oklahoma
People from Mineola, Texas
1944 births
Living people